Cinema Staff (stylized as cinema staff) are a Japanese alternative rock band from Gifu Prefecture, formed in 2003. Originally formed as Real when the band members were still in high school, they made their major debut on the label Pony Canyon in June 2012 with the release of their EP Into the Green. Their single "Great Escape" was used as the second ending theme to the anime television series Attack on Titan. Another single, "Kirifuda", was used as the fourth opening theme to the anime television series Yu-Gi-Oh! Arc-V.

Band members
Current members
 Tomotoka Tsuji – guitar
 Mizuki Iida – vocals, guitar
 Sōhei Mishima – bass guitar
 Yōhei Kuno – drums

Discography

Studio albums

Mini albums

Compilation albums

Extended plays

Singles

Awards and nominations

Notes

References

External links
Official website
Official blog
 Official MySpace
Official Twitter

Japanese rock music groups
Musical groups established in 2003
2003 establishments in Japan
Pony Canyon artists
Musical groups from Gifu Prefecture